Dr. José María Delgado (June 20, 1887, Malolos - December 24, 1978) was the first Philippine Ambassador to the Vatican. He was the cousin of Francisco Afan Delgado, descendant of General Martín Teófilo Delgado.

Early life
Delgado was born on 1969 in the Philippine city of Malolos. He was the fourth child of Juan Fausto Delgado and Eustaquia Salcedo y Concepción. He married Felisa Concepción by whom he has four boys: Jose, Jesus, Francisco, Antonio and four girls: Milagros, Pilar, Filomena, Teresita.

Career
In 1923, he returned to Manila and resumed his practice with old friends and classmates, establishing his own clinic in the city. It was during this period of his life that he began teaching obstetrics, pediatrics and gynecology at the University of Santo Tomas, while lecturing on medical ethics, sociology, anthropology, apologetics and religion. This would be a career path that would continue for 27 years and would earn him the distinction of being the only layman teaching theology.

Delgado was appointed as the first resident ambassador of the Republic of the Philippines to the Holy See in 1957. A post that his son Antonio C. Delgado would also hold. Written about Ambassador Delgado in a special issue of the Manila Chronicle, January 31, 1969 by Francisco De Leon: 

In 1966, he authored a book "Fe Y Patria," Discursos, conferencias y articulos.

Among some of the awards received through the life of Dr. José María Delgado: 
Most Outstanding Physician by the Philippine Federation of Private Medical Practitioners
Medal of Catholic Action of the Philippines, Pope Pius XI (1939)
Medal of the Pilgrims to Jerusalem
Papal Knight with decoration “Pro Ecclesia et Pontifice” (1927)
Knight of the Grand Cross
Order of Pius IX
Golden Cross Award by The University of Santo Tomas

When asked about his passions, Dr. Delgado is remembered as saying: “I have three loves in this life, God, Country and Culture. Upon his passing at the age of 91 on December 24, 1978, one might say that his life was an embodiment of these passions.

See also 
 Rufino Jiao Santos, First Cardinal of The Republic of The Philippines
 Antonio C. Delgado, Philippine Ambassador to The Vatican
 Lorenzo Ruiz, Filipino Saint

References
Encarnacion Alzona, El Legado De Espana A Filipinas, 1956
A Renaissance Man, Vera-Reyes, Inc, 1987.
Antonio C. Delgado, The Making of The First Filipino Saint, The Ala-Ala Foundation, 1982.
Jose Maria Delgado, Fe y Patria, 1966

1887 births
1978 deaths
People from Malolos
Filipino obstetricians and gynaecologists
Knights of the Order of Pope Pius IX
University of Santo Tomas alumni
Ateneo de Manila University alumni
20th-century Filipino medical doctors